José Rubén Figueroa Smutny (born 13 April 1967) is a Mexican politician affiliated with the Institutional Revolutionary Party. As of 2014 he served as Deputy of the LIX Legislature of the Mexican Congress representing Guerrero, and previously served in the Congress of Guerrero.

References

1967 births
Living people
Politicians from Guerrero
Institutional Revolutionary Party politicians
Panamerican University alumni
Members of the Congress of Guerrero
21st-century Mexican politicians
Deputies of the LIX Legislature of Mexico
Members of the Chamber of Deputies (Mexico) for Guerrero